Catherine Wanjiru (born 7 August 1978) was a Kenyan female volleyball player. She was part of the Kenya women's national volleyball team.

She participated in the 2002 FIVB Volleyball Women's World Championship. She competed with the national team at the 2004 Summer Olympics in Athens, Greece. She played with Kenya Pipelines in 2004.

Clubs
  Kenya Pipelines (2004)

References

External links
 Catherine Wanjiru at Sports Reference
 http://allafrica.com/stories/200712210452.html
 http://allafrica.com/stories/200711021011.html

1978 births
Living people
Kenyan women's volleyball players
Place of birth missing (living people)
Volleyball players at the 2004 Summer Olympics
Olympic volleyball players of Kenya